The World Dressage Championships is held every four years. The best horse and rider competitions in the world compete for individual and team titles. The Dressage World Championship is since 1990, held at the World Equestrian Games in conjunction with other equestrian world championships.

Individual Results

Team results

Medal count

 Note 1: Medal count is sorted by total gold medals, then total silver medals, then total bronze medals, then alphabetically.
 Note 2: Germany includes both Germany and West Germany.

External links
Denmark, Herning to be official host for FEI World Cup 2022

Dressage events
Quadrennial sporting events
Dressage